Dilan Gwyn (born 4 June 1987) is a Swedish actress who has worked in Sweden, France, England, Canada, and the United States. She is known for her roles in the films Where Atilla Passes (2015), The Convent (2018), and Sisters in Arms (2019), as well as the Freeform series Beyond (2016–2018) and the Viaplay series Älska mig (2019–2020).

Early life
Gwyn was born in Stockholm to parents who had fled Turkey in 1981 with her two older sisters. Regarding her ethnicity, she has said "I'm Armenian, Circassian, Greek, Kurdish and Turkish." Her father, Orhan Kotan, was a Kurdish writer and human rights activist who died when she was 11 years old.

She studied at Paris-Sorbonne University in Paris and Stockholm University. She trained in performing arts with the American Academy of Dramatic Arts, first at the Los Angeles campus and then the Manhattan campus, graduating in 2010.

Career
In 2012, Gwyn made her feature film debut in Shoo Bre and Plastic Films. Then in 2014, she made her television debut as Yana in the second season of the Starz historical fantasy series Da Vinci's Demons and appeared in the fantasy horror film Dracula Untold. Gwyn starred in the 2015 Canadian drama film Where Atilla Passes.

From 2016 to 2018, Gwyn starred as Willa Frost in both seasons of the Freeform science fiction series Beyond. This was followed by roles in the 2018 films The Convent, a British horror film, and It's All About Love, a Swedish comedy-drama. In 2019, Gwyn starred in the French war film Sisters in Arms and began playing Elsa in the Viaplay series Love Me.

Personal life
Gwyn lives in West Stockholm with her husband Emil and their daughter, born December 2021 at the Karolinska Hospital. She has also lived in London, Amsterdam, and Istanbul.

Filmography

Film

Television

Video games
 A Way Out (2018)

References

External links

Living people
1987 births
21st-century Swedish actresses
Actresses from Stockholm
American Academy of Dramatic Arts alumni
Paris-Sorbonne University alumni
Stockholm University alumni
Swedish people of Armenian descent
Swedish people of Circassian descent
Swedish people of Greek descent
Swedish people of Kurdish descent
Swedish people of Turkish descent